Three Chinese Poets is a book of poetry by the titular poets Wang Wei, Li Bai and Du Fu translated into English by Vikram Seth.  The Three Poets were contemporaries and are considered to be amongst the greatest Chinese poets by many later scholars.  The three have been described as a Buddhist recluse, a Taoist immortal and a Confucian sage respectively.  Though this trichotomy has been criticised as simplistic and artificial, it can act as a guiding approximation.  They lived in the Tang Dynasty and the political strife at that time affected all of their lives very much and this impact is evident in the poetry of all three.

It is not clear whether Wang Wei and Li Bai ever met, but they had a mutual friend in Meng Haoran.  Li Bai and Du Fu did meet and in fact Du Fu greatly admired Li Bai.

In the introduction of Three Chinese Poets, Seth talks about the influence of translations on his life and work; that while sometimes he has been so moved by a translation that he learnt another language to read the original, he doubts that he would ever be able to do this as much as he wished to.  However, he says that Charles Johnston's translation of Aleksandr Pushkin's Eugene Onegin, Richard Wilbur's translation of Molière's Tartuffe and Robert Fitzgerald's translation of the Iliad have helped him enter worlds without which would have been out of his reach.  He states that he avoided the style and philosophy of the famous translations by Ezra Pound which was to read and deeply understand a poem then to create an approximate translation inspired by the original - the judge of the merit being whether the new poem is a good poem in the new language.  Instead he wanted to follow the example of the translators mentioned above to retain a greater fidelity and to try to preserve structure such as rhyme.  He stresses that while he has tried not to lose meaning, he has often failed, explaining that because each word is much more important in poetry, the problem of losing associations of words is much greater than when translating prose.  He also makes note that any satisfaction derived from the tonality of the poems is necessarily lost because of the non-tonality of English.

Contents
 Wang Wei
 Deer Park
 Birdsong Brook
 Lady Xi
 Grieving for Meng Haoran
 Remembering my Brothers in Shandong on the Double-Ninth Festival
 The Pleasures of the Country
 Autumn Nightfall in my Place in the Hills
 Zhongnan Retreat
 Living in the Hills: Impromptu Verses
 Lament for Lin Yao
 Ballad of the Peach Tree Spring
 Li Bai
 In the Quiet Night
 A Song of Qui-pu
 The Waterfall at Lu Shan
 Question and Answer in the Mountains
 Seeing Meng Hoaran off to Yagzhou
 Listening to a Monk from Shu Playing the Lute
 The Mighty Eunuchs' Carriages
 Drinking Alone with the Moon
 Bring in the Wine
 The Road to Shu is Hard
 Du Fu
 Thoughts while Travelling at Night
 Spring Scene in Time of War
 Moonlit Night
 The Visitor
 Thoughts on an Ancient Site: The Temple of Zhu-ge Liang
 The Chancellor of Shu
 An Autumn Meditation
 Dreaming of Li Bai
 To Wei Ba, who has Lived Away from the Court
 The Old Cypress Tree at the Temple of Zhu-ge Liang
 A Fine Lady
 Grieving for the Young Prince
 Ballad of the Army Carts

Poetry anthologies
Books by Vikram Seth
1992 poetry books